This is a list of dales in the Yorkshire Dales, arranged geographically from south to north.  Side dales are indented under the dale from which they branch.  An alphabetical list follows at the end.

The Yorkshire Dales are dales in the Pennine area of the historic county of Yorkshire in northern England.  They do not include dales south of Airedale or dales in other areas of Yorkshire, for example in the North York Moors.  They are now mainly in the county of North Yorkshire, but some are now in Cumbria or County Durham.  Most of the dales are in the Yorkshire Dales National Park,  Nidderdale, Washburndale and Colsterdale are in the Nidderdale Area of Outstanding Natural Beauty.  Teesdale and its side dales, sometimes considered part of the Yorkshire Dales, are in the North Pennines AONB.

On 1 August 2016, the area of the National Park was increased by nearly a quarter, with an extra 161 square miles (417 square kilometres) of upland landscape given protected status.

Dales draining to the North Sea
Airedale
Goredale
Malhamdale, the upper valley of the River Aire
Wharfedale
Dibbdale
Washburndale, also known as the Washburn Valley
Mossdale
Littondale
Langstrothdale, the valley of the River Wharfe above Hubberholme
Nidderdale
Wensleydale
Colsterdale
Coverdale
Apedale
Waldendale
Bishopdale
Raydale
Cragdale
Bardale
Sleddale
Fossdale
Widdale
Cotterdale
Swaledale
Arkengarthdale
Birkdale
Uldale
Little Sled Dale
Great Sled Dale
East Stonesdale
Moresdale
Skegdale
West Stonesdale
Whitsundale (or Whitsun Dale)
Teesdale
Deepdale (or Deep Dale)
Baldersdale
Lunedale

Dales draining to the Irish Sea
Ribblesdale, the valley of the River Ribble above Hellifield
Clapdale
Silverdale, between Pen-y-Ghent and Fountains Fell
Stockdale
Crummackdale, the valley of Austwick Beck above Austwick
Lonsdale, the valley of the River Greta
Kingsdale
Doedale/Twisleton Dale or Chapel-le-Dale, the valley of the River Doe
Barbondale
Dentdale
Deepdale
Garsdale
Grisedale
(Mallerstang)
Ravenstonedale

Alphabetical list 
 Airedale
Apedale
 Arkengarthdale
Baldersdale
 Barbondale
Bardale
 Birkdale
 Bishopdale
 Chapel-le-Dale (Wisedale)
 Clapdale
 Coalsgarthdale
Colsterdale
Cotterdale
 Coverdale
Cragdale
Crummackdale
Deepdale (off Dentdale)
Deepdale (off Teesdale, now in Durham)
 Dentdale
 Dibbdale
 Doedale/Twistletondale
East Stonesdale
Fossdale
 Garsdale
 Goredale
Great Sled Dale
Grisedale
 Langstrothdale
 Little Dale
Little Sled Dale
 Littondale
Lonsdale
Lunedale
 Kingsdale
 Malhamdale
 (Mallerstang)
Moresdale
Mossdale
 Nidderdale
 Ravenstonedale
Raydale
 Ribblesdale
Silverdale
Skegdale
Sleddale
Smardale
Stockdale
 Swaledale
Uldale (NW of Grisedale)
Uldale (N of Little Sled Dale)
Waldendale
Washburndale
 Wensleydale
West Stonesdale
Whitsundale
Widdale
 Wharfedale

References 

 *
Dales
Yorkshire Dales